Saint Martin of Tours Catholic Church is a historic church at 133 S. Main Street in Saint Martinville, Louisiana.  The church was added to the National Register in 1972.

The church was founded in 1765 by Acadian refugees settling in Atakapa country;  the first church was probably designed by French military engineer Lieutenant Louis Andry.  The church was incorporated in 1814 by an act of the Louisiana legislature. Another act passed in 1820 authorized the congregation to run a lottery to raise funds to build a new church.  Completed in 1840, the current building was consecrated in 1844.

It was built originally as a simple rectangular plan church of the Roman basilica type, with the nave separated by a row of Doric columns from side aisles. It was expanded in the 1870s by addition of transepts and a semi-circular apse as well as by extension of the nave.

Next to the church is a monument dedicated to the Militiamen of St. Martinville who fought in General Bernardo de Galvez's army at the Battle of Baton Rouge. 36 of the militiamen were French Creoles, three were Acadians, and three colonial Americans, one's citizenship is not known. The monument was erected by the Louisiana Daughters of the American Revolution.

References

Roman Catholic churches in Louisiana
Churches on the National Register of Historic Places in Louisiana
Romanesque Revival church buildings in Louisiana
Roman Catholic churches completed in 1840
Buildings and structures in St. Martin Parish, Louisiana
National Register of Historic Places in St. Martin Parish, Louisiana
19th-century Roman Catholic church buildings in the United States